David William Craig (born 11 June 1969, in Glasgow) is a Scottish former professional footballer who played as a defender. He played for numerous clubs in the Scottish Football League, including East Stirlingshire, Dundee United, Hamilton Academical and Ayr United. He was named in the PFA Scotland Third Division Team of the Year for 2006–07 while playing for Dumbarton.

Career
Craig began his career at the end of the 1980s with Partick Thistle, making a dozen league appearances for The Jags before joining East Stirlingshire in 1991. Spending three years with The Shire, Craig won a move to Scottish Premier Division side Dundee United in 1994, making his league debut in November as a substitute. Craig's next league appearance came in February, and although he started a further three league matches, Craig appeared in only one matchday squad following the side's relegation, joining Hamilton Academical in September 1995.

After a year with Hamilton, Craig joined Kirkcaldy side Raith Rovers, returning to Hamilton after one season. Again, Craig spent a year with Accies before beginning a six-year stint with Ayr United, where his time included finishing as Scottish First Division runners-up and League Cup runners-up in the early 2000s. In 2004, Craig moved to Queen of the South in the era of captain  Jim Thomson. Craig spent a year in Dumfries, scoring once against Partick, before a short spell with Brechin City.

Returning to Partick in 2005, Craig was part of the side that won the First Division play-offs in 2005–06, winning promotion. He scored once in their promotion campaign against Stirling Albion. Instead of joining Thistle in the First Division, Craig moved to Dumbarton, spending two years with The Sons. After short spells with junior club Arthurlie and Montrose, and a trial with Stranraer, he joined Elgin City in 2009.

Honours

Ayr United
Scottish League Cup Runner-up: 1
 2001–02

Partick Thistle
Scottish First Division Play-offs: 1
 2005–06

References

External links 

1969 births
Living people
Footballers from Glasgow
Scottish footballers
Scottish Football League players
Partick Thistle F.C. players
Scottish expatriate sportspeople in Hong Kong
East Stirlingshire F.C. players
Dundee United F.C. players
Hamilton Academical F.C. players
Raith Rovers F.C. players
Ayr United F.C. players
Queen of the South F.C. players
Brechin City F.C. players
Dumbarton F.C. players
Expatriate footballers in Hong Kong
Montrose F.C. players
Stranraer F.C. players
Elgin City F.C. players
Association football defenders
Scottish Junior Football Association players
Arthurlie F.C. players
Maryhill F.C. players
Scottish expatriate footballers